"Because of You" is a song recorded by South Korean girl group After School. It was released on 25 November 2009 by Pledis Entertainment. The group also released an official remix version of "Because of You" on 21 January 2010. The title track was written, composed, and arranged by Brave Brothers, and it was the first release without member So-young and with new members Raina and Nana.

Background
Before After School made their comeback with "Because of You", Pledis announced the graduation of Soyoung and that two new members are to be added: Raina and Nana. Pledis then released teaser pictures showcasing a more mature concept with the members dressed in black and white suits, a change to their sexy concept that they debuted with. On 23 November, a music video teaser was uploaded and gained over 200,000 views in 24 hours. A remixed version of the song was released in January 2010.

Promotion
The group officially made their comeback on SBS's Inkigayo performing "When I Fall" and "Because of You". The group then performed on Inkigayo, KBS's Music Bank and MBC's Music Core on a weekly basis to promote the song. After School did not perform on Mnet's M! Countdown due to conflicts between Pledis and the broadcasting company. Pledis stated that the conflicts were "concerning the fairness of the MAMA awards."

Commercial performance
Prior to its release the single had accumulated over 30,000 pre-orders, a considerably high number for a small-agency group. Shortly after the song was released, the song topped various online music charts in South Korea and was an instant hit. The song achieved a daily and weekly "all-kill" by topping all daily and weekly charts on online music stores. "Because of You" then debuted at #1 on the Gaon Digital Chart for the month of December, which was a rarity for rookie groups from small agencies. It also went on to win a triple crown on SBS Inkigayo. The song has since been downloaded over 4,000,000 times, becoming After School's best selling song to date.

The physical single had similar success, debuting at #2 on the Gaon Weekly Album Chart and it managed to stay in the top 10 for 3 weeks. It has since gone on to sell over 20,000 copies in South Korea.

The remixed version of "Because of You" debuted at #76 on the Gaon Weekly Singles Chart and the b-side, When I Fall, debuted at #82 on the chart due to After School briefly promoting the song after they finished promotions for the title track.

Music video
A music video teaser was unveiled on 23 November and quickly gained over 200,000 views before the release of the full music video. The full music video was released on 25 November along with the release of the single.

Accolades

Track listing

Chart performance

Singles chart

 A^ The "Gaon Yearly Singles Chart" was formed at the end of 2010 and "Because of You" was released in 2009 so this is based on sales in 2010 alone.

Album chart

References

External links
 Official website

2009 singles
2009 songs
After School (band) songs
Korean-language songs
Hybe Corporation singles